This list of Arkansas Townships is based on the U. S. Census (2000) list of places in Arkansas. There are also former townships that have been combined with others or absorbed by urban expansion.

Arkansas counties are divided into townships.  Each township includes unincorporated space and some may have one or more incorporated towns or cities.  Incorporated municipalities can and often do straddle township (and sometimes even county) lines.

Townships in Arkansas have very limited functions. They are used as electoral districts for a Constable's. Most counties have now designated districts for these offices, which may ignore township boundaries. Nevertheless, the names are of considerable use to genealogists and historians because the United States Census is enumerated by township.  This allows researchers to see the numbers of people in a specific section of a county based on the US Census.

See also

List of cities and towns in Arkansas
List of counties in Arkansas

References

Further reading
 

Townships
Arkansas